These quarterbacks have started for the Washington Huskies. They are listed in order of the date of each man's first start at quarterback.

Main starting quarterbacks
These are the quarterbacks who were the passing leaders for that season.

See also
Pro-Football-Reference.com Washington Huskies

References

Lists of college football quarterbacks

Washington (state) sports-related lists
Seattle-related lists